"OK" is the second single by British R&B collective Big Brovaz. It was also the second single taken from their debut album, Nu-Flow, and was released on 3 February 2003. The album was re-released two weeks after the release of "OK" with the "OK" radio edit added and bonus tracks. 

"OK" became Big Brovaz' second UK top-10 hit, peaking at number seven and spending nine weeks inside the top 75 of the UK Singles Chart. Despite "Nu Flow" being a hit in Australia, "OK" was a commercial failure and their smallest hit there, peaking at a lowly number 64.

Track listings
UK CD1
 "OK" (radio edit)
 "OK" (rock remix)
 "OK" (Kardinal Beats vocal remix)
 "OK" (video)

UK CD2
 "OK" (radio edit)
 "OK" (Blacksmith remix)
 "Turn It Up"

Charts

Weekly charts

Year-end charts

Release history

References

2003 singles
Big Brovaz songs
Epic Records singles
Music videos directed by Jake Nava